Cuthonella concinna is a species of sea slug, an aeolid nudibranch, a marine gastropod mollusk in the family Fionidae.

Distribution
This species was described from Whitley Bay, Northumberland, England. It has been reported from the Northeast Atlantic from Finmarken, Norway south to Normandy, France and in the NW Atlantic from New England as well as from the NE Pacific at Vancouver Island, Canada. In Britain and Ireland it is a northern species, occurring at Skomer Island, Pembrokeshire and in the Irish Sea and Scotland. It is also reported from Iceland.

Description
The typical adult size of this species is 10–12 mm.

Habitat
Cuthonella concinna feeds on the hydroid Sertularia argentea, family Sertulariidae.

References

Cuthonellidae
Gastropods described in 1843